Araneus svanetiensis is an orb-weaver spider found in Georgia.

See also  
 List of Araneidae species: A

References

External links 

svanetiensis
Spiders of Europe
Spiders of Georgia (country)
Spiders described in 1997